The Democrat was a weekly English language newspaper published in Lithgow, New South Wales, Australia.

History
First printed and published on 5 June 1915 by Rudolph Schulstad for the Doogood Printing Company. It was published from 1915 - 1916. The paper was circulated in Lithgow, Portland, Blackheath, Wallerawang, Oberon, Mount Victoria, Hartley Valley, Wolgan, Excelsior, Rydal, Sodwalls, Tarana, Piper's Flat, Cullen Bullen, and other towns in New South Wales, Australia.

Digitisation
The paper has been digitised as part of the Australian Newspapers Digitisation Program of the National Library of Australia.

External links

See also
List of newspapers in Australia
List of newspapers in New South Wales

References

Defunct newspapers published in New South Wales
Newspapers on Trove